Arthur Conrad Grass (11 October 1897, at Denmark Hill, London – October 1994, at Brighton, Sussex), played cricket for Brazil in international matches in the 1920s and toured England with the 1932 South American team, when he appeared in three first-class matches.

Grass was a right-handed batsman who played four times in international matches between Brazil and Argentina in the late 1920s, mainly batting in the lower order. His highest score in these matches was 60, batting at No 9, in the third of three games in Buenos Aires in January 1930.

On the South Americans tour of England in 1932, he played in only three of the first-class games, batting mainly at No 10 and being not out four times in six innings. His highest was 24 not out against Sir Julien Cahn's XI. On the England tour as a whole, he only had 12 innings and did not bowl.

References

External links
 Wisden Cricketers' Almanack, 1933 edition, reports on the tour of England on pages 508 to 520
 CricketArchive.com

1897 births
1994 deaths
Brazilian cricketers
English emigrants to Brazil
South Americans cricketers
Brazilian people of English descent